Lora Leigh (born March 6, 1965) is a New York Times bestselling author of erotic romance novels. Leigh started publishing with electronic publisher Ellora's Cave in 2003. Leigh's longest-running series is The Breeds. She won the 2009 RT Award for erotica. Leigh was born, in Ohio and raised in Martin County, Kentucky, US.

Reception
Critical reception for Leigh's books have been mixed over the years. Romantic Times reviewed Soul Deep (Breed Series) giving it two stars out of five for an overabundance of plot contrivances, but giving Lion's Heat a four and a half star rating. Publishers Weekly has both praised (Maverick) and panned (Legally Hot) Leigh's work. Dear Author panned Leigh's work, citing Leigh's Menage a Magick (Ellora Cave Publishing) that the world building was "perfunctory".  International Business Times News called Deadly Sins "a fun guilty pleasure". Library Journal noticed the "unvarnished language of erotica" of Coyote's Mate

Fan events 
Leigh organizes various events to promote her work and connect with fans.  She holds an annual Reader's Appreciation Weekend for her fans; the 2010 event in Huntington, West Virginia, was her fourth.  She also hosts discussion groups on her work.

Bibliography

Stand Alone

The Breeds
Order as suggested by author.

Men of August

Nauti Boys

Nauti Girls

The SEALs

Elite Ops

Bound Hearts Series

The Legacy Series

The Callahans Series

Men of Summer

Brute Force

Law and Disorder

Moving Violations Series

Blood Ties

Cowboy

Chronicles of Brydon

Wounded Warrior

B.O.B

Wizard Twins

Kentucky Nights

Anthologies and collections

References

External links
Lora Leigh's Official Webpage

American erotica writers
American romantic fiction writers
1965 births
Living people
21st-century American women writers
Writers from Ohio